Don Valley North is a provincial electoral district in Toronto, Ontario, Canada. It elects one member to the Legislative Assembly of Ontario.

Don Valley North consists of the part of the City of Toronto lying within the following limits: commencing at the intersection of Bayview Avenue and Steeles Avenue East; east to Victoria Park Avenue, south to Highway 401, west to the Don River East Branch, north to Finch Avenue East, west along Finch Avenue to Bayview Avenue, and then north along Bayview Avenue to the point of commencement.

This riding was created from parts of Willowdale and Don Valley East during the 2012 electoral redistribution.

Geography
This riding is located in the northeastern part of the North York district in Toronto. It contains the neighbourhoods of Henry Farm, Bayview Village, Bayview Woods-Steeles, Hillcrest Village, Don Valley Village, and Pleasant View.

Members of Provincial Parliament

Election results

References

External links
Map of riding for 2018 election

Ontario provincial electoral districts
Provincial electoral districts of Toronto
North York